The 1936 World Fencing Championships were held in Sanremo, Italy. The championships were for non-Olympic events only.

Medal summary

Women's events

References

World Fencing Championships
International fencing competitions hosted by Italy
1936 in Italian sport